Jonathan Tate Reeves (born June 5, 1974) is an American politician serving as the 65th governor of Mississippi since 2020. A member of the Republican Party, Reeves served as the 32nd lieutenant governor of Mississippi from 2012 to 2020 and as the Mississippi State Treasurer from 2004 to 2012.

Early life and education
A native of Rankin County, Mississippi, Reeves is the eldest son of Terry Reeves and Dianne Peeples. Reeves's father founded a heating and air conditioning company in 1975 that became a multi-million-dollar business.  Reeves graduated from Florence High School in Florence. He then graduated from Millsaps College in Jackson with a degree in economics. He played college basketball for two years before injuring his shoulder.

At Millsaps College, Reeves was a member of the Kappa Alpha Order, a controversial fraternity that has faced accusations of racism. In 2019, yearbook photos surfaced showing members in blackface and Confederate uniforms, but it is unclear whether Reeves was involved.

Early career
After graduating from college in 1996, Reeves became a Chartered Financial Analyst. He worked at Park South Corporation, a subsidiary of the Deposit Guaranty National Bank, which eventually merged into AmSouth. In 2000, Reeves moved to Trustmark National Bank, where he was a financial portfolio manager until 2003, when he resigned to run for state treasurer.

Political career

Mississippi state treasurer (2004–2012)
Reeves sought the post of Mississippi state treasurer in the 2003 election; it was an open seat, as Democratic incumbent Marshall G. Bennett was retiring. In the 2003 Republican primary election, Reeves faced former Central District Transportation Commissioner Wayne Burkes of Brandon and State Representative Andrew Ketchings of Natchez. In the Republican primary election, Reeves led with 49% of the vote, with Burkes in second place. Because no candidate achieved a majority, Reeves and Burkes had a runoff election; Reeves defeated Burkes in the runoff, which had low turnout.

In the general election, Reeves defeated Democratic nominee Gary Anderson, the state director of finance and administration, 52% to 46%. Anderson has substantially more experience than Reeves, but Reeves's campaign raised and spent substantially more money. Observers also cited racial prejudice (Anderson is African American) as another factor that may have contributed to Anderson's loss. Reeves's father contributed $115,000 to his campaign, about one-fifth of its fundraising total.

Reeves's election made him the first Republican to hold the position of Mississippi state treasurer, as well as the youngest statewide elected official in the modern history of the state.

In 2007, Reeves won reelection with about 60% of the vote, defeating Democratic candidate Shawn O'Hara.

Lieutenant governor of Mississippi (2012–2020)
In February 2011, Reeves entered the race for lieutenant governor. In the August Republican primary, he defeated Mississippi State Senate president pro tempore Billy Hewes of Gulfport, 123,389 votes to 162,857. In the November general election, he was elected lieutenant governor, succeeding Phil Bryant, who was elected to his first term as governor. Reeves ran without Democratic opposition; he received 80.35% of the vote; Reform Party candidate Tracella Lou O'Hara Hill received 19.65%.

As lieutenant governor, Reeves was president of the state Senate, and he used his position to prevent Medicaid expansion from receiving a floor vote, and to block an increase in the gas tax to fund repairs to roads and to Mississippi's many structurally deficient bridges.

Reeves won reelection as lieutenant governor on November 3, 2015, defeating three opponents, including state Senator Timothy L. Johnson, a Republican-turned-Democrat.

Governor of Mississippi (2020–present)

2019 election
Reeves ran for governor of Mississippi in the 2019 election. He was the favorite to win the nomination. He enjoyed substantial name recognition from his 16 years in statewide office, and had a significant fundraising advantage over his rivals for the Republican nomination, former state Supreme Court Justice Bill Waller Jr. and Robert Foster, a first-term member of the state House.

During the primary race, three former state Republican party chairs endorsed Waller (who was viewed as more pragmatist), while outgoing governor Phil Bryant, former governor Haley Barbour, and Chris McDaniel endorsed Reeves (who was viewed as more conservative). Reeves strongly opposed Medicaid expansion under the Affordable Care Act, which he disparaged as the "Obamacare expansion." This position contrasted with that of Waller and Foster, who supported a version of Medicaid expansion to benefit Mississippi's rural hospitals, almost half of which were close to bankruptcy before the COVID-19 pandemic. Reeves also opposed increasing the gas tax to fund road and bridge repairs, while Waller supported it. Reeves said that "radical liberals" were attacking "Mississippi's culture and Mississippi's values."

In the Republican primary, Reeves and Waller finished in first and second place, respectively. Because no candidate won a majority of the total vote, Reeves and Waller proceeded to a runoff election. Reeves won the nomination in the runoff.

Reeves defeated the Democratic nominee, state Attorney General Jim Hood, in the November general election. Republicans won all eight statewide offices in 2019, a first in Mississippi history. The election was Mississippi's first competitive election for governor since 2003. Reeves received 459,396 votes to Hood's 414,368. He took office on January 14, 2020.

Political positions

Contraception
In May 2022, Reeves repeatedly refused to deny that he would ban birth control in Mississippi when questioned by anchor Jake Tapper. In particular, he refused to rule out banning IUDs, a form of birth control used by 1 in 7 women.

COVID-19

Amid the acceleration of the COVID-19 pandemic, Reeves was accused of undermining efforts to contain the spread of the virus. In early 2020, he closed schools, declared a state of emergency, and told people to trust in the "power of prayer", but did little to combat COVID-19 transmission. In March 2020, Reeves issued an order deeming most public places to be "essential services." His order prompted substantial criticism, largely because it clashed with previously issued local orders and caused confusion as to whether the order overrode local leaders' decisions to order the closures of businesses and other public places. Leaders of many of Mississippi's largest cities and counties criticized Reeves's order. The mayor of Tupelo said that Reeves had engaged in an "abdication of leadership." Days later, Reeves issued an amended order, clarifying that his previous order was not intended to interfere with local governments' decisions.

Reeves implemented a "stay-at-home" order in April 2020, but allowed some retail businesses to reopen shortly thereafter. In early May 2020, Mississippi had its largest spike of coronavirus deaths and cases up to that point. It had another sharp uptick in COVID-19 cases and deaths in November 2020. In December 2020, although Reeves urged the public to avoid large gatherings to prevent the further spread of the virus, his office invited legislators and other officials to at least three holiday parties at the Governor's Mansion.

Except for August 4 through September 30, 2020, Reeves did not issue a statewide mask mandate in the state, setting only county-by-county mandates in locations with rapid increases in infections. Of the state's 82 counties, 16 were under a mask mandate in November 2020, when the mandates expired. Effective April 30, 2021, Reeves ended COVID-19 restrictions (with the exception of the school mask mandate) through May 31, 2021. For the 2021–22 school year, he did not reinstate the mask mandate. At a political rally in July 2021, he called the Centers for Disease Control and Prevention's recommendations on indoor face coverings "foolish" and "harmful".

When a COVID-19 vaccine was made widely available, Reeves opposed vaccine requirements. Mississippi had one of the lowest vaccination rates among U.S. states, a fact Reeves downplayed. After President Joe Biden used his authority under the federal Occupational Safety and Health Act to require federal workers to be vaccinated against COVID-19 and to require all employers with more than 100 workers to require employees to be vaccinated against COVID-19 or receive weekly testing, Reeves called the mandate "tyranny" and an "attack on hardworking Americans." Biden responded by calling Reeves's remark "the worst kind of politics", referencing the 660,000 COVID-19 deaths in the U.S. up to that point and noting that "in Mississippi, children are required to be vaccinated against measles, mumps, rubella, chickenpox, hepatitis B, polio, tetanus and more." Reeves joined a Republican-led lawsuit against Biden's plan.

In August 2021, Reeves argued that Mississippi Christians were "less scared" because "when you believe in eternal life—when you believe that living on this earth is but a blip on the screen, then you don't have to be so scared of things." That month, Mississippi had the nation's highest rate of COVID-19 cases and deaths per capita.

During COVID-19, Mississippi suffered a shortage of hospital workers (in particular nurses). Reeves declined to call a special session of the legislature to allocate the state's $1.8 billion share of federal COVID-19 relief funds to address the crisis.

Criminal justice and prisons
In 2020, Reeves vetoed two criminal justice bills that would have expanded parole eligibility for Mississippi prisoners; one would have allowed nonviolent offenders to be considered for parole after serving 25% of their sentence, while the other would allow those convicted of violent crimes to be eligible for parole consideration after completing 50% of their sentence or 20 years, whichever comes first. In 2021, Reeves signed into law a narrower bill that expanded parole eligibility. He rejected calls to grant a pardon or commutation to Tameka Drummer, a Mississippi inmate serving a life without parole sentence for the possession of less than two ounces of marijuana; Drummer was sentenced in 2008 under the state's habitual-offender law.

As governor, Reeves faced significant problems with the state's prison system, especially Mississippi State Penitentiary at Parchman—including widespread, deadly violence and unsanitary, dangerous conditions. After nine prisoners died in one month at Parchman, Reeves acknowledged that Parchman's conditions were "terrible"; he ordered the closure of part of the complex, as well as other reforms. Several hundred inmates were moved from Parchman's infamous "Unit 29" to the privately operated Tallahatchie County Correctional Facility.

Early voting
In November 2020, amid the COVID-19 pandemic, Reeves said he would veto any bill that expanded mail-in voting or no-excuse early voting. Mississippi has among the most restrictive laws in the U.S. for pre-Election Day voting.

Education
Reeves used his 2020 budget proposal to appeal to the conservative base. Echoing Trump, he proposed allocating $3 million to a "Patriotic Education Fund" and said that "across the country, young children have suffered from indoctrination in far-left socialist teachings." Reeves's budget proposal recommended bonuses for schoolteachers in high-performing or improving schools, but largely ignored his 2019 campaign pledge to boost teacher pay in each year of his four-year term. He has proposed teacher raises in the 2022 budget.

Medical cannabis
In 2020, Mississippi voters approved (by 70%) a medical marijuana initiative; the state supreme court subsequently invalidated the initiative, holding that it was improperly placed on the ballot. Reeves opposed the initiative, but said he would honor "the will of the voters" who had overwhelmingly voted in favor of medical marijuana. On February 2, 2022, he signed the bill into law, making Mississippi the 37th state to legalize medical cannabis.

Race and Confederate iconography 
In April 2021, Reeves said, "There is not systemic racism in America." Earlier that month, he had declared April "Confederate Heritage Month" in Mississippi.

In June 2020, amid the George Floyd protests, debate arose about whether to change the flag of Mississippi, which featured Confederate insignia in the top left. Reeves initially said that the flag should only be changed by a voter-approved referendum, but later reversed himself, saying that if the Mississippi legislature passed a bill to retire the flag without a referendum, he would sign it. On June 28, 2020, the legislature voted to change the flag, 91 to 23 in the House and 37 to 14 in the Senate. Reeves signed the legislation two days later, removing the last state flag to display the Confederate symbol.

Taxation and budget
As governor, Reeves pushed legislation to eliminate the state's personal income tax. The rating agency Fitch raised concerns in November 2021 that his taxation plans were fiscally unfeasible.

Trump administration
Reeves is a staunch Donald Trump supporter. During his 2019 campaign for governor, Reeves touted the support of Trump, who carried the state in both 2016 and 2020. In his 2019 campaign for governor, Reeves promised, "If I'm elected governor, I will work for President Trump." Trump, his vice president Mike Pence, and his son Donald Trump Jr. all campaigned for Reeves in Mississippi in 2019. At a rally in Tupelo days before the November 2019 election, the elder Trump promoted Reeves's candidacy while assailing the impeachment inquiry against him over the Trump–Ukraine scandal.

After Joe Biden defeated Trump in the 2020 election, and Trump refused to concede, Reeves supported Trump-backed lawsuits to throw out the election results in several states Biden won, where Trump and his allies made false claims of fraud. In March 2021, Reeves acknowledged that Biden is the president of the United States and was "duly elected" but repeatedly refused to acknowledge that Biden was "legitimately and lawfully elected" or that the 2020 election was free and fair.

Personal life
Reeves is married to Elee Reeves (née Williams); they have three daughters. Reeves and his family attend Galloway Memorial United Methodist Church.

Electoral history

References

External links

 Official website
 

|-

|-

|-

|-

|-

|-

|-

 

 

1974 births
21st-century American politicians
American men's basketball players
Basketball players from Mississippi
CFA charterholders
Republican Party governors of Mississippi
Lieutenant Governors of Mississippi
Living people
Millsaps College alumni
People from Florence, Mississippi
People from Flowood, Mississippi
State treasurers of Mississippi
Candidates in the 2019 United States elections